Richard J. Lyons (May 9, 1895 – March 13, 1959) was an American politician and lawyer.

Lyons was born in Chicago, Illinois. He went to the Chicago public schools and then received his law degree from John Marshall Law School in Chicago. He lived in Libertyville, Illinois, with his wife and family. Lyons was involved with the Republican Party. In the 1938 and 1944, Lyon ran for United States Senator against Scott W. Lucas, losing both elections to Lucas. In 1940. Lyons ran against Illinois Governor Dwight H. Green for the Republican nomination for governor and lost the election.  He served on the Mundelein, Illinois, Village Board. Lyons served in the Illinois House of Representatives from 1929 to 1939. He then served on the Illinois Tax Commission from 1941 to 1943. Lyons served as deputy director of the Illinois Department of Revenue from 1943 to 1949. Lyons served as director of the Illinois Department of Revenue from 1953 until his death in 1959. Lyons died from a heart attack at his home in Libertyville, Illinois.

Notes

External links

1895 births
1959 deaths
Lawyers from Chicago
Politicians from Chicago
People from Libertyville, Illinois
John Marshall Law School (Chicago) alumni
Illinois city council members
Republican Party members of the Illinois House of Representatives
20th-century American politicians
20th-century American lawyers